"Surrender to Me" is a 1988 single and power ballad performed by Ann Wilson (lead singer of Heart) and Robin Zander (lead singer of Cheap Trick). The song was written by Ross Vannelli and Richard Marx and was featured on the soundtrack to the 1988 film Tequila Sunrise starring Mel Gibson, Michelle Pfeiffer and Kurt Russell. It peaked at No. 6 on the Billboard Hot 100 in March 1989.

Critical reception
Upon its release, Cash Box described "Surrender to Me" as a "dynamic ballad" which features a "natural pairing of two outstanding singers and two outstanding writers". The reviewer praised Zander as "one of the most underrated rock singers" and noted his "clarity of tone and a passion that is equalled by very few". Billboard noted that the "rock ballad" features "passionate performances" from Wilson and Zander. Pan-European magazine Music & Media felt it was a "typical rock ballad" and "more suitable for the American market".

Charts

Year-end charts

References

1988 songs
1988 singles
Rock ballads
Male–female vocal duets
Songs written by Richard Marx
Songs written for films
Capitol Records singles